The Dr. Richard Davis House, also known as "Woodside", is a historic Frank Lloyd Wright designed home in the Shady Hills neighborhood in Washington Township, just north of Marion in Grant County, Indiana.  The Usonian style home was constructed in 1955. An addition was completed in 1960.

It was listed on the National Register of Historic Places in 1997.

References

 Storrer, William Allin. The Frank Lloyd Wright Companion. University Of Chicago Press, 2006,  (S.324)

External links
Davis house on Wiki Marion
Photo of the Davis house
Davis house on flickr.com
Dr. Richard Davis House named Woodside

Frank Lloyd Wright buildings
Houses completed in 1955
National Register of Historic Places in Grant County, Indiana
Houses in Grant County, Indiana
Houses on the National Register of Historic Places in Indiana
1955 establishments in Indiana